Constance Smith (February 7, 1929 – June 30, 2003) was an Irish film actress, and contract player of 20th Century Fox in the 1950s.

Early life
Smith was born into a family as the first of 11 children. Her father was an infantryman, working for the Irish Army, and he died when Constance was a child. Her mother was not able to support all her children and Constance was sent to a convent. When Smith won a Dublin beauty contest at age 16 to find the girl who looked most like Hedy Lamarr, Smith's mother sent the photo to a film studio. As a result, Smith won a screen test, and although reluctant to seize the opportunity, she was pushed into the film industry by her mother, according to the actress.

Career
Smith moved to London, where she briefly joined the Rank Organisation. Studio executives were unamused by Smith's attitude, and she was eventually sacked before she made her breakthrough. She moved back to London, studied acting and played bit parts in several British B films. She had an uncredited role as a singer in the 1948 film noir Brighton Rock. In 1950, she was first noticed after playing an Irish maid in The Mudlark. Impressed with her performance, 20th Century Fox offered her a contract. Upon her arrival in Hollywood, producer Darryl F. Zanuck cast her opposite Tyrone Power in I'll Never Forget You (1951). However, he soon decided Smith was not experienced enough and replaced her with Ann Blyth.

She was most active in the 1950s, appearing in Hollywood features such as Man in the Attic and Treasure of the Golden Condor (1953) and Impulse (1954). Smith was a presenter at the Academy Awards ceremony in 1952.

By the time her contract expired in 1953, Smith had undergone an abortion and the first of her three marriages was on the ropes. As the years went on and Smith failed to get the parts she felt were commensurate with her abilities, she began an embittered descent into a life of drugs and alcohol. Constance last acted in a run of minor films made in Italy between 1955 and 1959, including a role as Lucretia Borgia in La congiura dei Borgia (1959). None of these did anything to resuscitate her failing career. During her time in Rome, she first attempted suicide by overdosing on barbiturates.

She made her last film appearance in 1959.

Personal life
Smith married English film director Bryan Forbes in 1951; they divorced in 1955. In 1962 she was sentenced to three months in prison for stabbing her boyfriend, the documentary maker and film historian Paul Rotha. On 4 February 1968, she stabbed Rotha for the second time and was charged with attempted murder. She and Rotha married in 1974, and broke up in 1978. Smith tried several times again to kill herself. Her last decades were spent, dissipated, in and out of hospitals. When able to get herself together for brief periods, she worked as a cleaner.

Death
Smith died on June 30, 2003 in Islington, London. She was 74.

Partial filmography

 Jassy (1947) – Young Lady (uncredited)
 Brighton Rock (1947) – Singer (uncredited)
 Easy Money (1948) – Wilson's Secretary (segment The Atkins Story) (uncredited)
 The Calendar (1948) – Airport Attendant (uncredited)
 To the Public Danger (1948, Short) – Girl in pub watching billiards game (uncredited)
 Murder at the Windmill (1949) – Cloakroom Girl
 The Perfect Woman (1949) – Receptionist
 Now Barabbas (1949) – Jean
 Trottie True (1949) – Gaiety Girl (uncredited)
 Room to Let (1950) – Molly Nusgrave
 The Mudlark (1950) – Kate Noonan
 Don't Say Die (1950) – Red Biddy
 The 13th Letter (1951) – Cora Laurent
 Blackmailed (1951) – Nurse Anne
 I'll Get You for This (1951) – Nina
 Red Skies of Montana (1952) – Peg Mason
 Lure of the Wilderness (1952) – Noreen McGowan
 Taxi (1953) – Mary Turner
 Treasure of the Golden Condor (1953) – Clara MacDougal
 Man in the Attic (1953) – Lily Bonner
 Tiger by the Tail (1954) – Jane Claymore
 Impulse (1954) – Lila
 The Big Tip Off (1955) – Penny Conroy
 Un po' di cielo (1955) – Nora
 The Violent Patriot (1956) – Emma Caldana
 Addio per sempre! (1958) – Lucia
 Conspiracy of the Borgias (1959) – Lucrezia Borgia
 Knight Without a Country (1959) – Laura (final film role)

Radio appearances

References

External links
 
 Constance Smith in 'Actors' file at Limerick City Library, Ireland

1929 births
2003 deaths
20th Century Studios contract players
Expatriate actresses in the United States
Irish expatriates in the United States
Irish film actresses
Actresses from Limerick (city)